The Pilgrim Congregational Church in Arkansas City, Kansas is a Richardsonian Romanesque-style church at 101 N. Third Street.  It has also been known as Church of the Nazarene.  It was built during 1891-93 and was added to the National Register of Historic Places in 2005.

It is built of sandstone walls with limestone used for trim, on an above-ground limestone foundation. Its roof has five gables;  the gable ends have parapets with metal caps and limestone cornices.

References

Churches on the National Register of Historic Places in Kansas
Richardsonian Romanesque architecture in Kansas
Churches completed in 1893
Buildings and structures in Cowley County, Kansas
National Register of Historic Places in Cowley County, Kansas